The 10th Parliament of Antigua and Barbuda was elected on 8 March 1994.

Members

Senate 
Unknown

House of Representatives

References 

Parliaments of Antigua and Barbuda